Peaches and cream is a dessert made with peaches and cream

Peaches and cream may also refer to:

Plants
Peaches & Cream, a variety of sweet corn

Arts, entertainment, and media

Music

Albums
Peaches and Cream, an album of dances and marches by John Philip Sousa, by Erich Kunzel Cincinnati Pops Orchestra 1984

Compositions and songs
"Peaches and Cream", a ragtime composition by Percy Wenrich 1905
"Peaches and Cream", a comedy duet in Bowery tough dialect by Ada Jones and Len Spencer, wax cylinder 1906
"Peaches and Cream", a fox trot composition by John Philip Sousa 1924 
"Peaches & Cream" (112 song)
"Peaches & Cream", a song by Beck from Midnite Vultures
"Peaches & Cream", a song by Bone Crusher from AttenCHUN!
"Peaches & Cream", a song by The John Butler Trio from Sunrise over Sea
"Peaches & Cream", a song written and recorded by Larry Williams; also recorded by the Ikettes in 1965
"Peaches N Cream" (Snoop Dogg song)
"Peaches 'N' Cream", a song by Mark O'Connor from Soppin' the Gravy
"Peaches N' Cream", a song by Supercharge from 1980
"Peaches 'N' Cream", a song by The Ikettes from 1965
"My Peaches and Cream", a song by Jerome Kern from the musical The Red Petticoat 1912